The Super Boxing League is the first professional boxing league in India. British-Asian businessman Bill Dosanjh and British boxing champion Amir Khan founded Super Boxing League in 2017, after Super Fight League's first season. The league is organised with the support of World Boxing Council and Professional Boxing Organisation India. The first season had 8 teams comprising both men and women pugilists.

Teams
List of all participating teams.

Scoring system
The Super Boxing League will follow a special points scoring system.

2017 SBL season
The first edition of SBL was held from July 7 to August 12, 2017 at Siri Fort, New Delhi.
Maratha Yoddhas beat Haryana Warriors to become inaugural champion. While  Sukhdeep Singh of Warriors was the Best Boxer of the league and Sandeep Chikara of Yoddhas was given the title of Best Knockout of the league.

References

Boxing in India
Boxing organizations
Amir Khan (boxer)
Sports organisations of India